Ergun Taner (born 1936) is a Turkish former footballer. He competed in the men's tournament at the 1960 Summer Olympics.

References

External links
 

1936 births
Living people
Turkish footballers
Olympic footballers of Turkey
Footballers at the 1960 Summer Olympics
People from Ergani
Association football defenders
Turanspor footballers